The Order of National Liberation was a decoration of the Socialist Federal Republic of Yugoslavia, the fifth-highest decoration in the series of Yugoslav decorations. The order was founded by Josip Broz Tito on 15 August 1943. It was awarded for "outstanding contribution in organizing and directing the uprising and the creation and development of the Socialist Federal Republic of Yugoslavia". It was designed by Croatian sculptor Antun Augustinčić in 1945. It is in the form of a badge worn on the left of the chest.

Notable recipients were Josip Broz Tito, Edvard Kardelj, Aleksandar Ranković and Ivan Isakov.

See also
Orders, decorations, and medals of the Socialist Federal Republic of Yugoslavia

Sources
 General Encyclopedia. Yugoslav Lexicographical Institute. Zagreb. 1980. 
 Prister, Boris. Odlikovanja. Povijesni muzej hrvatske. Zagreb. 1984. 

Awards established in 1943
Orders, decorations, and medals of Yugoslavia